Odin's Raven Magic is a 2002 orchestral setting to the Icelandic poem Hrafnagaldr Óðins. The composition was a collaboration by Sigur Rós, Hilmar Örn Hilmarsson, Steindór Andersen, Páll Guðmundsson and Maria Huld Markan Sigfúsdóttir. It was premiered at the Barbican Centre in London on 21 April 2002 and then performed at the Reykjavík Arts Festival on 24 May 2002. Video of the production can be viewed in the documentary Screaming Masterpiece or Gargandi snilld, by Ari Alexander Ergis Magnússon.

In October 2020, the band announced that a recording of Odin's Raven Magic would be released on December 4, 2020.

Track listing 
Adapted from MusicBrainz.

Charts

References 

Sigur Rós
2002 compositions
Norse mythology in music
Music based on poems